An Open Heart is a book written by the Dalai Lama Tenzin Gyatso and Nicholas Vreeland published by Little, Brown and Company, in 2002   
The book explains the fundamentals of Buddhism. 

Eastern philosophical literature
Books by the 14th Dalai Lama
2002 non-fiction books